Murgas or Murgaš may refer to:

Gilberto Alfredo Murgas (born 1981), Salvadoran football (soccer) player
José Antonio Murgas, Colombian politician
Jozef Murgaš (1864–1929), Slovak inventor, architect, botanist, painter, patriot, and Roman Catholic priest
26639 Murgaš, main belt asteroid named after Jozef Murgaš
 Murgaš (Ub), village in Serbia
 Murgaș, another spelling for Murgași Commune, Dolj County, Romania
 The plural of Murga, a form of musical theater performed in Uruguay and in Argentina during the Carnival season